Harold West may refer to:

 Harold West (rower), British rower
 Harold Dadford West (1904–1974), American biochemist
 Doc West  (Harold West, 1915–1951), American jazz drummer
 Harold West (golfer)
 Sir Harold West, dean of Loughborough University 1952–1957